Richard J. "Spike" Carey (January 7, 1929 – July 19, 2013) was an American politician from Maine. Carey served as an Alderman, Councilman, and as the longest serving Mayor of Waterville, Maine from 1970 to 1978. From 1967 to 1978, Carey also represented Waterville in the Maine House of Representatives. He served in the Maine Senate from 1992 to 2000 (term limited). In 2004, he ran again for the State Senate against incumbent Chandler Woodcock and lost. Carey was also the first Town Manager for the Town of Belgrade, Maine. He later served on the Town of Belgrade Board of Selectmen.

Personal
Carey was born and raised in the French-speaking South End of Waterville and did not speak English until he was 12 years old. His father was a member of the Waterville City Council. He graduated from Waterville High School.

References

1929 births
2013 deaths
Mayors of Waterville, Maine
Democratic Party members of the Maine House of Representatives
Democratic Party Maine state senators
American people of French descent